Kal Hourd (pronounced Hurd, born May 9) is a Canadian country music singer-songwriter. Hourd's debut album, Haven't Even Met Yet, was released in August 2009 by E1 Entertainment.

Career 
Hourd grew up in Stockholm, Saskatchewan. He took up music when he was young as, unlike many of his friends, he was not athletic. He was encouraged to perform by Brad Johner, whom he met and jammed with in 2001, and so he started entering talent quests. He began writing songs for his first album in 2006. In 2007, he won a rising star award at the 2007 Saskatchewan Country Music Association (SCMA) Awards.

He released his debut album Haven't Even Met Yet in August 2009. It featured 12 songs, eight of which Hourd had co-written. Prior to the release of the album, Canadian astronaut Julie Payette asked for a copy of Haven't Even Met Yet to take with her on a mission to the International Space Station, on the Space Shuttle Endeavour. The same year, 2009, Hourd's single Beautiful Sound, co-written by Missouri songwriter Deanna Harper, reached No 50 on the Canadian Country chart, his song When Pink Is Just a Color Again was chosen as the Pink Ribbon International official song, and he won Video of the Year for When Pink Is Just a Color Again at the SCMA awards. At the 2010 SCMA Awards, Hourd received awards for album of the year for Haven't Even Met Yet, as well as single of the year and song of the year for Beautiful Sound. In 2012, When Pink Is Just a Color Again won him a second SCMA song of the year award. In 2016, he co-wrote the song Covered In Dust with Darlene Tuleta, who recorded the single and video. Hourd was also leader of The Kal Hourd Band.

Discography

Albums

Singles

References

External links

Kal Hourd at CMT

Canadian country singer-songwriters
Canadian male singers
Living people
Musicians from Saskatoon
Year of birth missing (living people)
Canadian male singer-songwriters